Shayne Stevenson may refer to:

Shayne Stevenson (footballer),  Australian AFL player
Shayne Stevenson (ice hockey), Canadian NHL player